was a Japanese kabuki and film actor.

Career
Sawamura, whose original name was Yūichi Katō, was born in Tokyo to the kabuki actor Denzō Takeshiba. He studied acting under Sōjūrō Sawamura VII before taking the stage name Kunitarō Sawamura IV in 1926, appearing mostly as an onnagata. He began his movie career at the film studio Makino Productions in 1929, and later moved to Nikkatsu, working most of the time in jidaigeki. After the war, he mainly worked as a character actor.

Family
Both Sawamura's own family and that of his wife were active in the film industry. Sawamura's younger brother and sister were the actors Daisuke Katō and Sadako Sawamura. He married Tomoko Makino, the daughter of Shozo Makino, a film director and the head of Makino Productions. His brothers in law were thus the film directors Sadatsugu Matsuda (1906–2003), Masahiro Makino (1908–1993), and Shinzō Makino, as well as the producer Mitsuo Makino. Masahiro married the actress Yukiko Todoroki and their son—and thus Sawamura's nephew—Masayuki Makino, is the head of the Okinawa Actor's School. Sawamura fathered the actors Masahiko Tsugawa and Hiroyuki Nagato, both of whom married famous actresses, Yukiji Asaoka and Yōko Minamida respectively.

Selected filmography

The Million Ryo Pot (1935)
Gate of Hell (1953)
Ghost of Saga Mansion (1953)
Rokunin no ansatsusha (1955)
Shin Heike Monogatari (1955)

References

External links
 
 

People from Tokyo
Japanese male stage actors
Japanese male silent film actors
1905 births
1974 deaths
20th-century Japanese male actors
Kabuki actors
Male actors from Tokyo